The 2008–09 Welsh League Cup season was won by The New Saints, beating Bangor City in the final. It was the third victory for The New Saints in the competition, and the fifth appearance by Bangor City in the final. The final took place at Latham Park, in Newtown, Wales. The match was refereed by Phil Southall.

Round and draw dates
Source

Group stage
Sources

Group 1

Group 2

Group 3

Group 4

Group 5

Group 6

Knockout stage
Source

Quarter-finals

|}

Semi-finals

 
|}

Final

See also
 Welsh League Cup
 Welsh Premier League
 Welsh Cup

References

External links
Official League Cup Website
 Welsh-Premier.com Loosemores League Cup
Loosemores Solicitors Official Website

Welsh League Cup seasons
League Cup